St John's High School is a reputed senior secondary school in the Mohan Nagar area of Nagpur, Maharashtra state, India. Established in 1880, it is one of the oldest schools in Nagpur.

History
St. John's High School was established by the missionaries of St. Francis de Sales at the later end of the 19th century in Nagpur city. The exact date of establishment is unknown. Since 1867, St. Francis de Sales (S.F.S) School caters the educational needs of Anglo-Indians and European children, majority of these families lived in Nagpur city as locals then. St. John's school is a new subsidiary of the (S.F.S) school which was expanded to serve the Indian Christian children. Therefore prefered medium of instruction was Hindi as per the local needs.
 
The Indian section of the department of S.F.S School admitted both Hindu and Muslim students alongside Indian Christians. As the number of students steadily increased, this  organisation under the guidance of the mentors and governing bodies evolved into a separate institution. It was then named as St. Francis Xavier's school. Although goverance remained under the management of S.F.S. school, but the new school was accommodated in the Nagpur Cathedral compound.

In 2016 Fr. Patric Wall MSFS, was in charge of the Indian Christians and students. He was given the responsibility of managing daily operations of the St. Francis Xavier's School. During his time the school was again renamed as R.C. Mission school, and it was shifted to a newly constructed building in the Cathedral compound. Fr. Wall also succeeded in getting the school affiliated to the Calcutta University.
 
In 1912 Fr. John D’Costa MSFS was appointed as principal of R.C. Mission School. During his time, the school steadily increased in enrollment. It also made remarkable progress in academics, as well as sports and games. Since it was difficult for the R.C. Mission school to continue in the cathedral compound for want of space, Fr. D’Costa decided to shift the school to a more spacious place at Mohan Nagar. The school was renamed as St. John's High School and was shifted in 1929 to the new building at Mohan Nagar. At first the middle school classes, and later the primary and high school sections, were shifted to the new campus. The first batch of 39 students appeared for SSC in 1916.
 
"In 1951 an agreement signed between Very Rev. Fr. A. Grorod MSFS, Superior General of the MSFS, and Bishop Gayet MSFS of Nagpur. Accordingly, St. John’s high School was handed over to the MSFS, who made it their mother house".

The school at present has a strength of 2950 boys and 93 members on the staff. Instruction is given in Hindi and English from pre-primary to Class Ten. Fr. A.G. Lobo along with Br. Herold began the work of the first floor of the school building in February 1952, adding seven more classrooms, The front tower was built in 1953, surmounted by a cement cross in February 1954 and adorned in May 1954 with a tower-clock, which was brought from France.

There were a few eminent teachers and staff of St. John's, including S.B. Shastry, who won the Best Teacher State Award in 1969 and H.G. Chourse, another winner of the best Teacher National Award in 1981-82.
 
The school was declared as a Heritage Building for the city of Nagpur on 16 February 2000, because of its peculiar architectural design.

Holy Cross Sisters in St. John’s
From the "Family Annals" of the Holy Cross Sister of Chavanod it is traceable that the sisters began their association with St. John's School in 1953. This began with a formal request made by the then Superior of St. John's to the Provincial Superior of the Sisters, who gladly sent a team of three sisters. They were Sr. Vitalis D’Souza, Sr. Angela Lobo and Sr. Mercia Alvares, who took up teaching in the pre-primary and primary sections of St. John's school. Since then the sisters continue to render their valuable services in St. John's until today.
 
Since there was no convent of their own, the sisters had a lot of difficulties in finding a proper accommodation. Initially, from 1953 to 1957, they stayed at Victoria Building which was on rent. From 1957, the sisters stayed at a hostel on Mount Road extension which they opened for working women. In 1971 they began staying at St. John's. Since June 1990 the sisters have continued their association with St. John's while residing at S.F.S.

New venture
The existing primary building is situated at the south of the main school building. As it was old and dilapidated, the management had thought of constructing a new building for the pre-primary and primary sections of St. John's school for quite some time. A serious thought of constructing a new building for the primary section of the school was given during the time of Fr. K.V. Joseph, who was its principal (1994–96). On 28 March 1995, an ambitious plan was proposed in the presence of a large number of people (mostly staff and students) by Fr.Angelo Fernandes provincial of Nagpur province. He then blessed the foundation stone and it was laid by the chief guest, Rajesh Tambay, Mayor of Nagpur and the guest of honour Sunil Argarwal, the Deputy Mayor. Others who were present at the function were Fr. Joseph Plattotham, the Manager of St. John's and Sr. Lucy Mathew, the headmistress of the primary section.
 
Though the construction began in all earnestness it could not go further than laying the foundation and raising the columns for the ground floor. It remained in that stage for a few years until the construction work began again. This was during early 2000 the time of Fr. K.V. Joseph as principal. Now the main building of the primary school is almost ready with 23 classrooms and the offices. Part of the plan of a multipurpose hall for the primary section remains unattended. A lot of work remains to be done before it is found fit to shift to the new premises which is situated on the north of the existing high school building.
 
St. Johns School has been in existence since 1880. During its 123 years of existence, the institution has built up a unique tradition of imparting all around education to the ordinary and under privileged children in and around Nagpur. Numerous former students of this institution are well established in life in India and abroad.

The school inititated the Sanjana - Shastri award for academic excellence in high school in honor of two of their famous teachers, and the Premnath Award for excellent performance in drama and theater.This award is named after the film actor Prem Nath, a former student of the school.

References

High schools and secondary schools in Maharashtra
Christian schools in Maharashtra
Catholic secondary schools in India
Schools in Nagpur
Educational institutions established in 1880
1880 establishments in India